Prathima (Kannada: ಪ್ರತಿಮಾ) is a 1978 Indian Kannada film, directed and produced by Sudhir Menon. The film stars Vishnuvardhan, Bharathi, Mamatha Shenoy and Ambareesh in the lead roles. The film has musical score by Khanu Ghosh.

Cast
Vishnuvardhan
Bharathi
Mamatha Shenoy
Ambareesh

References

External links
 

1970s Kannada-language films